Zibrov (Russian: Зибров, Ukrainian: Зібров) is a Slavic masculine surname, its feminine counterpart is Zibrova. Notable people with the surname include:

Andrei Zibrov (born 1973), Russian actor
Pavlo Zibrov, Ukrainian pop singer and songwriter

Russian-language surnames